The 1985–86 Hong Kong First Division League season was the 75th since its establishment. It produced a rare instance of two unbeaten teams in the same league, as South China and Happy Valley both won 10 games and drew the other 8. South China won the league on goal difference.

League table

References
1985–86 Hong Kong First Division table (RSSSF)

Hong
Hong Kong First Division League seasons
1985–86 in Hong Kong football